The 2014 Panda Cup was the inaugural edition of Panda Cup, an under-19 association football competition. The tournament was hosted in Chengdu between 4 and 8 June 2014. Players born on or after 1 January 1995 are eligible to compete in the tournament.

Participating teams

Venues

Standings

Matches
All times are China Standard Time (UTC+08:00)

Goalscorers
3 goals
 Ewandro

2 goals

 Gabriel Boschilia
 Gerson
 Liu Haidong
 Filip Faletar

1 goal

 Leandro
 Duje Ćaleta-Car
 Antonio Mance

Own goal
 Duje Ćaleta-Car (against New Zealand)

References

2014 in association football
2014 in Chinese football
June 2014 sports events in China
International association football competitions hosted by China